Texas is a 2005 Italian drama film written and directed by Fausto Paravidino and starring Riccardo Scamarcio and Valeria Golino. It was screened in the Horizons section at the 62nd Venice International Film Festival.

Plot

Cast  
Valeria Golino as Maria
Riccardo Scamarcio as Gianluca
 Valerio Binasco  as  Alessandro
 Fausto Paravidino as Enrico 
 Iris Fusetti as  Cinzia
 Alessia Bellotto as  Elisa 
 Carlo Orlando as Davide

See also
 List of Italian films of 2005

References

External links

Italian drama films
2005 drama films
2005 directorial debut films
2005 films
2000s Italian-language films
2000s Italian films
Fandango (Italian company) films